Paul d'Albert de Luynes (5 January 1703 – 21 January 1788) was a French prelate. He was elected the seventh occupant of Académie française seat 29 in 1743.

Early life
Paul d'Albert de Luynes was born on 5 January 1703 in the city of Versailles, where his family occupied the Hôtel de Luynes, a grand hôtel particulier. He was the second son of Marie Anne Jeanne de Courcillon (d. 1718) and Honoré-Charles d'Albert de Luynes (1669–1704). His elder brother was Charles Philippe d'Albert de Luynes, who became the 4th Duke of Luynes (and married Louise-Léontine de Bourbon, Princess of Neuchatel and a granddaughter of Louis de Bourbon, Count of Soissons).

His father was the eldest son of Charles Honoré d'Albert, 3rd Duke of Luynes, but did not become the Duke of Luynes because he died before his father. His maternal grandfather was Philippe de Courcillon, the French officer and diarist. He was also the great-great-grandson of the Charles d'Albert, duc de Luynes, a favorite of King Louis XIII.

Career
On 17 February 1729, he was selected Bishop of Bayeux, France. He was confirmed on 17 August 1729 and ordained on 25 September 1729. On 9 August 1753, he was selected to succeeded Jean-Joseph Languet de Gergy	as Archbishop of Sens. He resigned as Bishop of Bayeux on 21 September 1753 and was confirmed as Archbishop on 26 November 1753. 

Less than three years later on 5 April 1756, he was elevated to Cardinal. On 2 August 1758, he was installed as Cardinal-Priest of San Tommaso in Parione. Considered one of the "seminary-trained clerical aristocrats," the Cardinal was called upon in the Fontainebleau of Marie Antoinette to rebuke the fashionable vices of courtiers:

"Everything he had prepared had been composed in order to recall high society to the unassuming ways of real Christians. Some hundred of peasants, sitting on their clogs, surrounded by the baskets they had used to carry their vegetables or fruit to market, listened to His Eminence without understanding a single word he addressed to them...[But he was heard] to cry out, in the vehemence of the perfect pastor, 'My dear brethren, why do you bring this luxury with you into the very entrance to the sanctuary? Why do these velvet cushions, these laced and fringed handbags, lie in front of your entry into the Lord's house?"

Scientific interests
During his time in Bayeux, he protected the Académie des Sciences, Arts et Belles-Lettres de Caen and from 1731 to 1753, his residence in Caen housed the sessions of the Academy. An amateur astronomer who was deeply interested in physics, he made several important astronomical observations and worked closely with Réginald Outhier.

He was elected the seventh occupant of Académie française seat on 29 in 1743.

De Luynes endorsed the chocolate manufacturer Brasselard, a grocer based on the Rue de Tournon in the 6th arrondissement of Paris who was also endorsed by the Société Royale de Médecine. In 1776, when correspondeding with the physician Théophile de Bordeu regarding de Bordeau's recommendation that the Cardinal refrain from eating chocolate, which his personal doctor encouraged, he wrote: "The view of the learned chemist who has analysed it and who concludes from these experiments that the use of cacao is very advantageous for old people, whose radical moisture dries out with age; the experiment I made over two years of the marked advantage that I always derived from it with regard to the looseness of the belly and the sweetening of my phlegm, have caused me to remain firm in my sentiment and the more so since it is not out of gourmandise that I am attached to it, my palate in no may please by the taste of cacao."

Personal life
He had a summer residence in Sommervieu in the Normandy region in northwestern France.

De Luynes died in Paris on 21 January 1788.

Gallery

References
Notes

Sources

External links

Paul Cardinal d’Albert de Luynes †

1703 births
1788 deaths
People from Versailles
18th-century French cardinals
Archbishops of Sens
Bishops of Bayeux
Members of the Académie Française
Members of the French Academy of Sciences
House of Albert